Sathar Island() is an island located in a distributary of the Periyar River in the Ernakulam district of the Indian state of Kerala. The land strip is about 2 km in length and 156 acres in area. The population is below 500. It is connected to the main land by Sathar island bridge.

History
The mainland Sathar Island is believed to be created in mid 1800s. The original strip of land was much smaller and the main land is man-made island filled with soil.

References

Further reading

External links
 "Sathar island will soon become a centre for Oyster farming, courtesy CMFRI". India Environment Portal.

Geography of Ernakulam district
Islands of Kerala
Periyar (river)
Islands of India
Populated places in India